Tony Zasada (11 December 1960 – 19 August 1984) was a Canadian rower. He competed in the men's coxed pair event at the 1984 Summer Olympics. He was killed in a road crash five days after the conclusion of the 1984 Olympics.

References

External links
 

1960 births
1984 deaths
Canadian male rowers
Olympic rowers of Canada
Rowers at the 1984 Summer Olympics
Rowers from Hamilton, Ontario
Pan American Games medalists in rowing
Pan American Games bronze medalists for Canada
Rowers at the 1983 Pan American Games
Road incident deaths in Canada